Christopher Allan Stray (born 29 October 1943) is a British historian of classical scholarship and teaching.

Early life and education
Born at Norwich, son of Peter Stray and Margaret (née Beard), Stray read Classics at Sidney Sussex College, Cambridge, taking a BA in 1966 and MA in 1985. He worked as a classics teacher, including at Latymer Upper School, West London, and was a member of the JACT Ancient History Committee in the late 1960s, under the chairmanship of Sir Moses Finley.

Career
His academic writings began with his PhD thesis (1994, University College, Swansea) on the history of classical education in England, which was published as Classics Transformed: Schools, Universities and Society in England, 1830-1960 (Oxford University Press, 1998 ). The book was awarded a Runciman Prize in 1999. Stray has also worked on the history of universities, on examinations, and on institutional slang.

Despite never holding a salaried academic post, Stray has held numerous prestigious fellowships and honorary positions, including: Honorary Research Fellowship, Dept of History and Classics, Swansea University (from 1989); Visiting Fellowship, Wolfson College Cambridge (1996–98); John D and Rose H Jackson Fellowship, Beinecke Library, Yale University (2005); Senior Research Fellowship, Institute of Classical Studies, University of London (2010–18); Member of the School of Historical Studies, Institute for Advanced Study, Princeton (2012). He has also been active in collaborative research projects, and in the organisation of conferences and colloquia, including: Convener of the Textbook Colloquium (1988–99); co-organiser (with Stephen Harrison and Chris Kraus) of conference on “Classical Commentaries” (Oxford, 2012); member of advisory board, “Classics and Class in Britain”, King's College London, 2013–16 (from 2016 “People’s History of Classics”); co-organiser (with Stephen Harrison) of conference on “Liddell & Scott” (Oxford, 2013). A colloquium in his honour was held in Oxford in October 2018, organised by Stephen Harrison. In 2021 De Gruyter published the Festschrift, Classical Scholarship and Its History From the Renaissance to the Present. Essays in Honour of Christopher Stray, edited by Stephen Harrison and Christopher Pelling.

Personal life
Stray married anthropologist Margaret Kenna, of Swansea University; they have a son.

Works

Books
The Living Word: W. H. D. Rouse and the Crisis of Classics in Edwardian England (Bristol Classical Press, London 1992) 
Classics Transformed: Schools, Universities and Society in England, 1830-1960 (Oxford University Press, 1998) 
Classics in Britain, 1800-2000 (Clarendon Press, 2018)

As editor
The Classical Association: The First Century 1903–2003 (Classical Association, 2003) 
Classics in 19th and 20th Century Cambridge: Curriculum, Culture and Community (Cambridge Philological Society, 2005; Proceedings of the Cambridge Philological Society, Supplement 24) 
The Owl of Minerva. The Cambridge praelections of 1906. Reassessments of Richard Jebb, James Adam, Walter Headlam, Henry Jackson, William Ridgeway and Arthur Verrall (Cambridge Philological Society, 2005; Proceedings of the Cambridge Philological Society, Supplement 28 
Remaking the Classics. Literature, genre and media in Britain (1800–2000) (Duckworth, 2007) 
Gilbert Murray Reassessed. Hellenism, Theatre, and International Politics (Oxford University Press, 2007) 
Oxford Classics: Teaching and Learning 1800–2000  (Duckworth, 2007) 
Classical Books: Scholarship and Publishing in Britain Since 1800 (Institute of Classical Studies, School of Advanced Study, University of London, 2007; Bulletin of the Institute of Classical Studies, Supplement 101) 
Classical Dictionaries. Past, present and future (Duckworth, 2010) 
Sophocles’ Jebb: A Life in Letters (Cambridge Philological Society,  2013; Cambridge Classical Journal supplement, 38). 
Expurgating the Classics: Editing Out in Greek and Latin (Bristol Classical Press, London 2012) 
With David Butterfield: A. E. Housman: Classical Scholar (Duckworth, 2009) 
With Michael Clarke and Joshua Katz) Liddell and Scott: The History, Methodology, and Languages of the World's Leading Lexicon of Ancient Greek (Oxford University Press, 2019) 
With Judith P. Hallett: British Classics Outside England – The Academy and Beyond (Baylor University Press, Waco, Texas, 2008) 
With Lorna Hardwick: A Companion to Classical Receptions (Wiley, 2008) 
(with Chris Pelling and Stephen Harrison) Rediscovering E.R.Dodds: Scholarship, Poetry, and the Paranormal (Oxford University Press, 2019) 
With Jonathan Smith: Cambridge in the 1830s. The Letters of Alexander Chisholm Gooden, 1831–1841 (Boydell Press, Woodbridge, 2003) 
With Jonathan Smith: Teaching and Learning in Nineteenth-century Cambridge (Boydell & Brewer, Woodbridge, 2001)

As contributor
Classics in the curriculum up to the 1960s (in The Teaching of Classics ed. James Morwood, Cambridge University Press, 2003)

References

1943 births
Living people
Academics of Swansea University
Alumni of Sidney Sussex College, Cambridge
Historians of education